Orhem is a district in Skarpnäck borough, Stockholm, Sweden. Orhem has 82 inhabitants as of December 31, 2006.

Orhem has a small number of permanent housing. There are several allotment gardens in Orhem. A large part of Orhem is in the Flaten nature reserve.

References

External links

Districts of Stockholm